The 2020–21 Calgary Flames season was the Flames' 41st season in Calgary, and the 49th season for the Flames' National Hockey League franchise that was established on June 6, 1972. The Flames attempted unsuccessfully to make the playoffs for a third straight year after getting eliminated in the First Round of the 2020 Stanley Cup playoffs by the Dallas Stars.

Due to the Canada–United States border restrictions brought in as a result of the COVID-19 pandemic, the Flames were re-aligned with the other six Canadian franchises into the newly-formed North Division. The league's 56-game regular season was played entirely within the new divisions, meaning that Calgary and the other Canadian teams played an all-Canadian schedule for the 2020–21 regular season as well as the first two rounds of the 2021 Stanley Cup playoffs. The Flames were eliminated from playoff contention on May 10 after the Edmonton Oilers defeated the Montreal Canadiens 4–3 in overtime.

Standings

Divisional standings

Schedule and results

Regular season
The regular season schedule was published on December 23, 2020.

Player statistics

Skaters

Goaltenders

†Denotes player spent time with another team before joining the Flames. Stats reflect time with the Flames only.
‡Denotes player was traded mid-season. Stats reflect time with the Flames only.
Bold/italics denotes franchise record.

Draft picks

Below are the Calgary Flames' selections at the 2020 NHL Entry Draft, which was originally scheduled for June 26–27, 2020 at the Bell Center in Montreal, Quebec, but was postponed on March 25, 2020, due to the COVID-19 pandemic. The draft was held October 6–7, 2020 virtually via Video conference call from the NHL Network studio in Secaucus, New Jersey.

References

Further reading

Calgary Flames seasons
Flames
Flames